Guido Nicolaes (born 15 July 1950) is a Belgian footballer. He played in two matches for the Belgium national football team in 1974.

References

External links
 

1950 births
Living people
Belgian footballers
Belgium international footballers
Place of birth missing (living people)
Association football forwards